William Eugene Bryson Sr. (March 3, 1915 – January 31, 1986) was an American sportswriter who wrote for The Des Moines Register from 1937 until his retirement in 1978. He covered 32 consecutive World Series.

Early life
Bryson was born and raised in Winfield, Iowa.

Career
Bryson began his career as a reporter for the Winfield Beacon, his hometown newspaper.

Bryson Sr. has been called "one of the finest sportswriters in the country and widely recognized as such." As his son Bill describes in The Life and Times of the Thunderbolt Kid, due to the quality of Bryson Sr.'s work, one prominent television sports journalist thought of him as being "possibly the greatest baseball writer there ever was." He contributed to Baseball Digest and many other publications.

The Babe Didn't Point: And Other Stories About Iowans and Sports, a book of some of his best sports stories, was published by his son Michael.

Personal life and death
Bryson married Mary Agnes McGuire (1913-2015), an editor for The Des Moines Register. They had three children: Michael (who also became a sports journalist), Bill Jr. (who also became a journalist and a writer), and Mary Elizabeth. Bryson died of an apparent heart attack, on January 31, 1986, at his home in Des Moines, Iowa.

References

External links
 

1915 births
1986 deaths
20th-century American non-fiction writers
American sportswriters
Baseball writers
People from Henry County, Iowa
Writers from Des Moines, Iowa